Khalifeh Kenar (also Romanized as Khalīfeh Kenār and Khalīfehkanār) is a village in Ziabar Rural District, in the Central District of Sowme'eh Sara County, Gilan Province, Iran. At the 2006 census, its population was 241, in 63 families.

References 

Populated places in Sowme'eh Sara County